Japanese singer Rina Aiuchi has released eight studio albums, four compilation albums, two remix albums, 43 singles and 13 video albums. In 2000, Aiuchi released her debut studio album, Be Happy. It has sold more than 306,000 copies nationwide and yielded four singles: "Close to Your Heart", "It's Crazy for You", "Ohh! Paradise Taste!!", and "Koi wa Thrill, Shock, Suspense". A year later, Aiuchi released her second studio album Power of Words, which has sold 420,000 copies nationwide and became her best-selling album. The record was promoted by five singles, "Faith", "Run Up", "Navy Blue", "Forever You: Eien ni Kimi to", and "I Can't Stop My Love for You", all of which achieved commercial success.

In 2003, Aiuchi released her third studio album A.I.R.. The album yielded six singles, including three top-three hits: "Deep Freeze", "Kaze no Nai Umi de Dakishimete", and "Full Jump". Her fourth album Playgirl (2004) reached number seven in Japan. The lead single from the album, "Dream×Dream" peaked at number six and has sold over 60,000 copies in Japan.

In 2006, Aiuchi released her fifth studio album Delight. The album spawned a hit double-A side single, "Glorious"/"Precious Place", which peaked at number five in Japan. After the commercial failure of the two follow-up albums, Trip (2008) and Thanx (2009), Aiuchi released her second compilation album All Singles Best: Thanx 10th Anniversary in 2009. The album was a commercial success, reaching number five on the Oricon albums chart. However, Aiuchi announced her retirement from the music industry at the end of 2010, and her eighth and last album Last Scene was released in September 2010.

In 2018, Aiuchi released her comeback single "Warm Prayer" under the name of R.

Albums

Studio albums

Compilation albums

Remix albums

Box set

Singles

As a lead artist

As a featured artist

Promotional singles

Other appearances

Video albums

References

Discographies of Japanese artists
Pop music discographies